Justin Trudeau, the 23rd and current prime minister of Canada, has made 66 trips to 39 different countries since his premiership began on November 4, 2015. Trudeau did not make any international trips between February 2020 and June 2021, due to the COVID-19 pandemic.

Summary 
The number of visits per country where he travelled are:

 One visit to Armenia,  Cambodia, Cuba, Ethiopia, India, Ireland, Israel, Indonesia, Jamaica, Kuwait, Liberia, Madagascar, Mali, Malta, Netherlands, Papua New Guinea, Rwanda, Saint Kitts and Nevis, Senegal, Spain, Singapore, Thailand, Tunisia, Turkey, Vatican City, and Vietnam
 Two visits to Argentina, the Bahamas, China, Costa Rica, Italy, Latvia, Mexico, Peru, Poland, the Philippines, Switzerland, and Ukraine
 Three visits to Japan
 Five visits to Belgium and Germany 
 Eight visits to France
 Nine visits to the United Kingdom
 Twenty-three visits to the United States

2015

2016

2017

2018

2019

2020

2021

2022

2023

Future trips

2023 
The following international trips are scheduled to be made by Justin Trudeau during 2023:

Multilateral meetings 
Justin Trudeau participated in the following summits during his premiership:

See also 
 Foreign relations of Canada

References 

International prime ministerial trips
Foreign relations of Canada
Trudeau, Justin
Lists of diplomatic trips
21st century in international relations
2015 in international relations
2016 in international relations
2017 in international relations
2018 in international relations
2019 in international relations
2020 in international relations
2021 in international relations
2022 in international relations
2023 in international relations